This is a list of the Princesses of Taranto, a principality in Southern Italy.

Countess consort of Taranto

Princess consort of Taranto

House of Hauteville, 1088–1194

House of Hohenstaufen, 1194–1266

Capetian House of Anjou, 1266–1374

House of Baux, 1374–1383

House of Welf, 1383–1393 
 None

House of Orsini, 1393–1406

Capetian House of Anjou, 1406–1414

Capetian House of Anjou, 1414–1420

House of Orsini, 1420–1463

House of Clermont, 1463–1465 
 None

House of Trastámara, 1465–1501

Titular Princess consort of Taranto

House of Trastámara, 1501–1506

House of Laval, 1506–1554 
 Anne de Laval (1505–1554)

House of La Trémoille, 1554–1971

House of Ligne-La Trémoille, since 1971

See also
 List of consorts of Sicily
 List of consorts of Naples
 List of consorts of Albania
 Duchess of Calabria
 Princess of Achaea
 Princess of Antioch

Sources

 PRINCIPI di TARENTO

 
Taranto
Taranto